The 2022 City of Wolverhampton Council election took place on 5 May 2022 to elect members of City of Wolverhampton Council. This was on the same day as other local elections. 20 of the 60 seats were up for election.

Background
Since its first election in 1973, Wolverhampton Council has been a Labour council, aside from a brief period from to 1978 to 1979 when the party was overtaken by the Conservatives. Labour has controlled the council for its entire existence apart from brief periods of no overall control (1978 to 1980, 1987 to 1988, 1992 to 1994, and 2008 to 2011). In the 2021 election, Labour lost 5 seats with 47.2% of the vote, and the Conservatives gained 5 seats with 43.0%.

The seats up for election this year were last elected in 2018. In that election, Labour gained 2 seats with 58.04% of the vote, the Conservatives lost 1 with 33.69%, and UKIP lost representation on the council with 0.93%.

Council composition 

Changes:
 June 2021: Gurmukh Singh joins Conservatives from Labour
 December 2021: Harman Banger (independent after losing Labour whip) resigns after being found guilty of fraud
 April 2022: Lovinyer Daley wins by-election for Labour from independent

Results

Results by ward
An asterisk indicates an incumbent councillor.

Bilston East

Bilston North

Blakenhall

Bushbury North

Bushbury South and Low Hill

East Park

Ettingshall

Fallings Park

Graiseley

Heath Town

Merry Hill

Oxley

Park

Penn

Spring Vale

St Peter's

Tettenhall Regis

Tettenhall Wightwick

Wednesfield North

Wednesfield South

References

Wolverhampton
Wolverhampton City Council elections
2020s in the West Midlands (county)